Arena Oskarshamn  is a football stadium in Oskarshamn, Sweden  and the home stadium for the football team Oskarshamns AIK. Arena Oskarshamn has a total capacity of 2,000 spectators.

References 

Football venues in Sweden